7 Days Out is an American documentary television series that premiered on Netflix. The show's 6-episode first season was released on December 21, 2018.

Each episode of the show follows a major event, beginning with 7 days before as organizers and employees plan the logistics and details prior to the event's start. Events from the first season include the Kentucky Derby, Westminster Dog Show, a League of Legends competitive tournament,  the renovation of Eleven Madison Park, Chanel's Haute Couture fashion show, and the finale of the Cassini mission.

Episodes

References

External links 
 
 

English-language Netflix original programming
Netflix original documentary television series
2010s American documentary television series
2018 American television series debuts
2018 American television series endings
Television series by Boardwalk Pictures